Wycombe is an unincorporated community mainly in Wrightstown Township but also in Buckingham Township, Bucks County, Pennsylvania, United States. Founded in the 1890s when the Pennsylvania Northeastern Railroad opened a line through the county, it was called "Lingohocken", the traditional Indian name of the area assigned to it by local residents. But the post office was named Wycombe to prevent confusion with the post office in Wingohocken. The Lingohocken Fire Company, located on the edge of town, retains this older name. New Hope Railroad still owns the rail line through the town, and, having finished restoring the former Reading Company station building in 2011, intends to restore service through Wycombe. They also store some of their original passenger cars last used in the 1970s adjacent to the station.

The Bridge in Buckingham Township, Gen. John Lacey Homestead, and Wycombe Village Historic District are listed on the National Register of Historic Places.

References

Unincorporated communities in Bucks County, Pennsylvania
Unincorporated communities in Pennsylvania